Klickitat Street is a city street located in northeast Portland, Oregon, United States. Additional disconnected segments are east of Rocky Butte from 105th to 117th, 148th to 154th, and 163rd to 165th. A segment named Klickitat Court is between 135th and 140th.

The street is one of Portland's most heavily used bicycle throughways and was selected as one of 15 streets slated for improvement as a "next-generation bicycle boulevard" by the city of Portland. Planned improvements included a flashing beacon at the intersection with NE 33rd, which can be enabled by bicyclists and pedestrians to increase safety and maintain low vehicular traffic.

The street is named after a local Native American tribe, the Klickitat, and became famous as the fictional home of the characters Henry Huggins, Ramona Quimby and Beatrice "Beezus" Quimby in a series of children's novels by Beverly Cleary. Cleary grew up on nearby Hancock Street, and said the name reminded her of "the sound of knitting needles." There are statues of the characters in the Beverly Cleary Sculpture Garden in nearby Grant Park.

See also
 List of streets in Portland, Oregon

References

Streets in Portland, Oregon
Tourist attractions in Portland, Oregon